Raymond Laurence Young (7 September 1938 – 2 December 2000) was an Australian politician. He was a Liberal member of the Western Australian Legislative Assembly from 1971 to 1983.

Young represented the district of Wembley from 1971 to 1974 and the district of Scarborough from 1974 to 1983.

References

Members of the Western Australian Legislative Assembly
People educated at Perth Modern School
Liberal Party of Australia members of the Parliament of Western Australia
1938 births
2000 deaths
People from Mount Magnet, Western Australia
20th-century Australian politicians